The 1980 U.S. Senate election for the state of North Dakota was held November 4, 1980. The incumbent, Republican Senator Milton Young, was retiring.  Republican Mark Andrews defeated North Dakota Democratic-NPL Party candidate Kent Johanneson to fill the vacated seat.

Andrews, who had served as a Representative since 1965, easily received the Republican nomination, and the endorsed Democratic-NPL candidate was Kent Johanneson. Andrews and Johanneson won the primary elections for their respective parties.

Two independent candidates, Harley McLain and Don J. Klingensmith also filed before the deadline under the Chemical Farming Banned and Statesman parties respectively. McLain would later run for the same seat in 1998 against then incumbent Byron Dorgan.

Election results

Notes

External links 
 1980 North Dakota U.S. Senate Election results

1980
North Dakota
1980 North Dakota elections